McKinley Davis Wheat (June 9, 1893 – August 14, 1979), was a Major League Baseball catcher from 1915 to 1921.

From 1915 to 1919, he was a teammate of his brother, Zack Wheat, on the Brooklyn Robins. The Philadelphia Phillies bought Mack in 1920. He finished out his professional career in 1922 in the Pacific Coast League.

External links

1893 births
1979 deaths
Major League Baseball catchers
Baseball players from Missouri
Brooklyn Robins players
Philadelphia Phillies players
Augusta Tourists players
Newark Indians players
Binghamton Bingoes players
Los Angeles Angels (minor league) players